Wiktor Wysoczański (born 24 March 1939, in Verkhnie Vysotske) is an Old Catholic bishop and the present Superior of the Polish Catholic Church. He became Superior in 1995, succeeding Bishop Tadeusz Majewski. As Superior, Wysoczański was chosen by the National Synod of the Church and consecrated by at least three bishops who are members of the International Conference of Old-Catholic Bishops (the Utrecht Union).

References

1939 births
Living people
People from Lviv Oblast
Polish Old Catholic bishops
Christian Peace Conference members